"Red Snow" is the second segment of the twenty-first episode of the first season (1985–86) of the television series The Twilight Zone. In this segment, a compassionate KGB colonel is sent to a Siberian town to investigate the deaths of the local Communist Party officials, and finds evidence that supernatural beings inhabit the town.

Plot
KGB Colonel Ilyanov is sent to a Siberian town to investigate the deaths of two Soviet Communist Party officials. The local investigation concluded that one was torn apart by wolves, and the other cut his own throat. However, Ilyanov notes that his throat was cut after his death. He meets a young woman named Valentina. Records on her state that she was exiled by Joseph Stalin 50 years prior. Party official Polvin says that Valentina is actually the daughter of the exiled woman.

Ilyanov and mayor Titov search the site of the "suicide", a supposedly abandoned church which has footprints in the snow going in and out. They hear a wolf wailing close by. Ilyanov follows the sound and finds Valentina feasting on a wolf's blood. He is knocked unconscious. Upon awakening he insists upon entering the church, now believing that the deaths were committed by vampires. However, the coffins in the church are all empty. Valentina and Polvin appear and explain that since the region is perpetually dark this time of year, they do not have to spend the day in coffins. The townspeople agreed to give sanctuary to vampires from all over Europe in exchange for protection from criminals and wild animals.

Valentina wants to kill Ilyanov but Titov warns it will bring more investigators, and proposes to make Ilyanov sympathetic to their situation. As Valentina is insistent, Ilyanov flees the church with Titov, fearing they will also kill him. They are attacked by wolves and Titov is killed. Ilyanov despairs, saying he tried to use his position to help those who were unjustly persecuted by the Communist Party, but the good he did was never enough to outweigh the deaths he caused to avoid raising suspicions about himself. Now convinced that he is not like other KGB, Valentina persuades Ilyanov that by becoming a vampire he can take down the Communist Party from within and restore the true Russia.

Ilyanov returns to Moscow and tells his superiors Titov committed the murderers and was executed, and Polvin, who helped greatly in the investigation, was appointed the new mayor. Ilyanov is congratulated for his work and smiles, planning to spread his vampiric gift to like-minded individuals.

References

External links
 
 Postcards from the Zone episode 1.52 Red Snow

1986 American television episodes
The Twilight Zone (1985 TV series season 1) episodes
Television episodes about vampires
Television episodes set in the Soviet Union

fr:La Neige rouge